Rambhai is a social networking site founded by a small group of students of 2000 batch of Indian Institute of Management of Ahmedabad, India in 2006.

This newslink sharing website was created based on two basic principles; of free expression and of user moderation. It has been a growing community since it started.

Initially a community based predominantly on India related news it has evolved over the months to include content from all around the world.

Members refer to themselves as Rambhaiyyas.

Site description 

Rambhai functions on a simple concept. It brings readers out of the shackles of editors's choices and gives them the freedom to decide what they read and what is published on the site's frontpage.

When Rambhaiyyas find any news that could be of interest to Indians, they submit it to the site. The current categories for submissions are news, business, technology, sports, cricket, movies, India shining, Masti, lets' discuss, travel and miscellaneous. Submissions often leads to discussions. Every member is invited to join in as they come and go.  Reader vote for links they like. A topic makes it to the homepage only after it has received a certain number of votes.

Rambhai operates a karma point system. Individual members gets a score on scale of 1 to 10 based on their level of contribution to Rambhai. The score is based on posting good stories, commenting on other stories, voting for links and duration of membership. The score adds weight to the member's vote.

Rambhai.com is powered by Pligg , an open-source social networking content management system (CMS). It combines social bookmarking, blogging, web syndication and a democratic editorial system that enables users to collaboratively submit and promote articles.

Use of Rambhai is free.

History 

The website was started by a 2000-batch student of IIM-A in 2006. Rambhai.com is now maintained by a group of individuals.

Rambhai Kori is an owner of a tea stall outside the campus of Indian Institute of Management Ahmedabad. Kori was an electrician before he opened his 'chai' joint, where he has been supplying tea for the last 25 years.

For years he has been the first point of contact outside the campus for students new to the city, and provides them with necessary information. Students also meet Kori for getting real examples for their case studies and feedback on the dynamics of the local market. After classes, they gather in his shop to discuss any topic.

Kori found many of his customers did not come just for the tea, they also preferred to stand around and talk. He would sometimes join the discussions and exchanged his views and opinions. His chai shop gradually transformed into a venue for discussions and debate on wide-ranging topics. Along with the tea he served topics and issues to think and talk about.

It was decided to start a website to bring Kori's chai-time discussions online for the world to share. The spirit that led to starting Rambhai.com is the same behind every involved discussions at every neighbourhood chai-waalas.

Name 

Rambhai.com was named after Rambhai Kori, a tea vendor outside IIM Ahmedabad,

Kori believes, the name Rambhai symbolises the neighborhood chaiwallas; in colleges, outside workplaces, anywhere one can takes a break to have a cup of chai or coffee and discuss anything and everything. Rambhai.com aspires to be such a place on the Internet.

The punchline, as explained by Rambhai himself, represents what his website stands for; news and views that are Zara Hatke News (news with a little difference).

The logo shows the steaming teacup of Rambhai with the promise of news with a difference.

References

External links
Rambhai.com
Pligg
The Silly Point - Blogger Friend of Rambhai
IndiaSphere - Indian Social Aggregator similar to Rambhai

Indian social networking websites